Breiden Fehoko (born October 15, 1996) is an American football defensive end for the Los Angeles Chargers of the National Football League (NFL). He played college football at LSU and was part of the 2020 National Championship winning team. He is the son of Vili and Linda Fehoko, and performed the Haka, a traditional Māori dance, with family members prior to LSU football games and on Hard Knocks.

Professional career

Fehoko signed with the Los Angeles Chargers as an undrafted free agent in 2020. He was waived on September 5, 2020, and signed to the practice squad the next day. He was elevated to the active roster on November 28 and December 5 for the team's weeks 12 and 13 games against the Buffalo Bills and New England Patriots, and reverted to the practice squad after each game. He signed a reserve/future contract with the Chargers on January 5, 2021.

On August 31, 2021, Fehoko was waived by the Chargers and re-signed to the practice squad the next day. He was promoted to the active roster on November 17, 2021.

Fehoko made the Chargers initial 53-man roster in 2022, but was waived on September 12, 2022 and re-signed to the practice squad. He was promoted to the active roster on November 9.

Personal life
His cousin Simi Fehoko plays wide receiver in the NFL for the Dallas Cowboys.

References

External links
 LSU Tigers profile

1996 births
Living people
American football defensive tackles
Texas Tech Red Raiders football players
LSU Tigers football players
Los Angeles Chargers players
Players of American football from Honolulu